Artur Volodymyrovych Remenyak (born 9 August 2000) is a professional Ukrainian football winger who plays for Lviv.

Career
Remenyak is a product of the FC Lviv youth sportive school system.

He made his debut for FC Lviv as a second half-time substituted player in the winning away match against FC Desna Chernihiv on 22 November 2020 in the Ukrainian Premier League.

References

External links
Profile at UAF Official Site (Ukr)

2000 births
Living people
Ukrainian footballers
Ukrainian Premier League players
NK Veres Rivne players
FC Lviv players
Association football forwards
Ukraine youth international footballers
Ukraine under-21 international footballers